Aashiqui is a 1990 Indian Hindi musical romantic drama film and first installment of Aashiqui series directed by Mahesh Bhatt, starring Rahul Roy, Anu Aggarwal and Deepak Tijori in pivotal roles. The film was known for its music, by composer duo Nadeem–Shravan (Nadeem Akhtar Saifi and Shravan Kumar Rathod) establishing their careers along with that of singer Kumar Sanu and music label T-Series.

Upon release, it received positive reviews and emerged as a commercial success. The soundtrack album has been rated fourth by Planet Bollywood on their "100 Greatest Bollywood Soundtracks". It was the best selling Bollywood album at the time of its release. At the 36th Filmfare Awards, the film received 7 nominations and won 4 awards with a sweep in the music categories. The film was remade in Kannada as Roja (2002).

The soundtrack album sold 20million units, making it the best-selling Bollywood soundtrack album of all time. A cover version of one of its songs, "Dheere Dheere" was later performed by Yo Yo Honey Singh and released in 2015. A sequel to the film, Aashiqui 2, with a completely new theme, directed by Mohit Suri with Aditya Roy Kapur and Shraddha Kapoor, was released on 26 April 2013.

Plot
Rahul (Rahul Roy) is angry with his dad for marrying a second wife, while his mother is still alive; in rage and in fury he pays an uninvited visit to the wedding where he throws his mother's mangalsutra and all the other household items she preserved. He breaks the windows of the wedding car and is hence arrested and sent to the nearest police station.

Meanwhile, Anu (Anu Aggarwal) runs away from an oppressive girls' hostel run by Arnie Campbell (Tom Alter), who immediately reports to the police station that she is missing. The police catch her and keep her at a nearby police station (which happens to be the same one where Rahul is held).

While waiting for Arnie, Rahul offers Anu his jacket, which she accepts. Arnie then arrives and takes her back to the oppressive hostel, promising the police inspector that this will not happen again. After they leave, the inspector turns to Rahul and offers him some advice, then releases him to return to his broken home.

Rahul can not stop thinking about the beautiful Anu. The very next day, Rahul goes to the hostel area wishing to meet her and spots his jacket hanging outside. Since she lives in a girl's hostel there is no way he can enter. Hence, he plays cricket with his friend and deliberately hits the ball into the compound. The security lets him inside to retrieve the ball. Rahul goes inside and sees Anu climbing a ladder. She is very surprised by his presence and falls off the ladder. Rahul is unable to express his feelings for her so he wrote a note on the electricity bill his mother told him to pay that very day. Anu takes the note and leaves. His mother becomes upset that Rahul did not pay the bill and asks his Master (tailor) to help get the bill back.

The tailor helps Rahul retrieve the bill, along with a reply from Anu requesting him to meet her at the main city library the following Saturday. He arrives on time eagerly, where Anu tells him she has nothing to give him except a "thank you", but Rahul says no one can stop him from loving her, not even herself.

Soon after he leaves, Arnie catches her and takes her to Ooty (another town) to be admitted to another hostel. Rahul employs a spy to eavesdrop and see where Anu is going. The spy learns about Anu's travel plans and informs Rahul, who goes along with his friend to search for Anu and finds the place she is staying. They find out that Arnie actually planned to get Anu married and lied to her about transferring her to a new hostel, because she would not have agreed.

At the hostel, Arnie organises a farewell party for Anu and Anu invites Rahul, who promises to attend the party. After the party they plan to elope. At the party, he runs away with Anu and then Arnie catches them by using the police. Anu has to return with Arnie and go to Ooty, while Rahul returns to his home.

After a few months, Rahul approaches Mr. Arnie as he can not forget his friend Anu, who he knows is unhappy. Rahul then finds out from Arnie that Anu is an orphan who has a distant relative in Ooty named Uncle Peter who is an alcoholic. Long long ago, Peter had signed the documents to have full custody over her.

Rahul asks Arnie about Anu's whereabouts and other details so that he could help her settle (and be more happy) and Arnie (wanting to help Anu) reveals everything. They both find Anu in a miserable state with Uncle Peter and bribe the uncle for a sum of 20,000 rupees on the condition that he signs documents giving up his legal guardianship of Anu.

After Anu is finally free from Arnie, the hostel and Uncle Peter, she wishes to become self-reliant and seeks admission in a typing institute. 
One day, she comes across a job advert searching for a model to run for "Jean Cardin" brand of clothes in Mumbai who requests Anu to audition. 
Anu agrees and wins a sum of 10,000 rupees along with a free tour of Paris and a secured residence. She thanks Rahul for all his help, but Rahul tells her that he loves her deeply and wants to marry her as soon as possible. Anu agrees, but she says she will need some time to prepare.

Rahul's mother (Reema Lagoo), on hearing their story visits Anu and offers some advice, as she knows Anu is a lonely orphan, advising her not to marry him until he achieves something in life as equality of status between partners is essential for a healthy relationship.

The next day, Rahul comes to the place where Anu is having a photo shoot session. He hears the man in charge telling her to change into a swimming costume, to which Rahul objects. He tells him that they were planning to get married soon and he disapproves of such revealing clothes. He is even more shocked when he learns that Anu already signed a contract promising she would not get married for two years.

Rahul is heartbroken by her decision and pens Anu a letter written with his blood.

As the years go by, Rahul establishes himself as a singer while Anu is also successful as a model. Rahul plans to meet Anu now, but Padamsee (Homi Wadia) reveals to Rahul that it's thanks to Anu that his debut record was released to market, which hurts Rahul deeply as he now doubts his own mettle and talent. Hence, Rahul cancels their marriage plans.

Anu, grieved by Rahul's decision, decides to further her career under director Padamsee, who persuades her to accompany him to Paris.

Rahul's mother enlightens him that Anu had refused to marry him earlier because of her suggestion, and that Anu was only a medium for his talent to reach the public - it was his singing that made him successful and popular. She urges him to go back to Anu, his true love.

When Rahul comes to stop her from boarding the flight, Anu agrees to abandon the director and stays behind to renew their relationship.

Cast
 Rahul Roy as Rahul Vikram Roy
 Anu Aggarwal as Anu Verghese
 Deepak Tijori as Balu
 Avtar Gill as Police Inspector Deshpande
 Tom Alter as Arnie Campbell
 Reema Lagoo as Mrs. Vikram Roy
 Homi Wadia as Mr. Padamsee
 Mushtaq Khan as Rafoo Master
 Javed Khan as Uncle Peter
 Anang Desai as Mr. Paul
 Virendra Saxena as Street Singer
 Sunil Rege as Vikram Roy 
 Kumar Sanu as small villain

Reception
Aashiqui was credited as an all-time blockbuster at the Box-Office in 1990 mainly due to its melodious music. With a low budget of 80 lakh Indian Rupees, it grossed 5.0 crores Indian Rupees at Box-Office, with the shows running to full houses for 52 weeks.

Awards and nominations

Soundtrack

The music for Aashiqui was composed by the duo Nadeem–Shravan (Nadeem Akhtar Saifi and Shravan Kumar Rathod) and lyrics were written by Sameer, Rani Mallik and Madan Pal. The soundtrack largely falls under the filmi-ghazal genre, based on the ghazal style.

Sales 
Aashiqui became the highest-selling album in the history of Indian music industry. In an interview, Bhushan Kumar said that no music album has been able to break the music record of Aashiqui. The soundtrack album sold 2crores units. This made it the best-selling Bollywood soundtrack album of all time, as well as one of the best-selling albums of any genre in India. It had a big impact on Bollywood music, ushering in ghazal-type romantic music that dominated the early 1990s, with soundtracks such as Dil, Saajan, Phool Aur Kaante and Deewana. Initially Aashiqui was a music album planned by Gulshan Kumar on the name CHAAHAT, while Mahesh Bhatt heard the songs he suggested
to make a film. Aditya Pancholi gave the voice to Rahul Roy.

Reception 
Rakesh Bandhu of Planet Bollywood gave the album 9 stars saying, "Aashiqui was a success in its own right. It is truly a beautiful collection of compositions by the Nadeem-Shravan." The soundtrack became very popular upon release, becoming the best selling Bollywood soundtrack of the year by a wide margin.

Dheere Dheere 

A cover version of the song "Dheere Dheere Se" was later performed by Indi-pop artist Yo Yo Honey Singh, released as "Dheere Dheere" in 2015. The song's music video features actors Hrithik Roshan and Sonam Kapoor. As of November 2021, the song has received over 500million views on YouTube.

References

External links
 

1990 films
1990s Hindi-language films
Indian romantic musical films
1990 romantic drama films
Films directed by Mahesh Bhatt
Films scored by Nadeem–Shravan
Films shot in Ooty
Indian romantic drama films
Indian musical drama films
Films with screenplays by Robin Bhatt
Films with screenplays by Akash Khurana
Hindi-language romance films
T-Series (company) films
Hindi films remade in other languages